Southern rock is a subgenre of rock music and a genre of Americana. It developed in the Southern United States from rock and roll, country music, and blues and is focused generally on electric guitars and vocals. Author Scott B. Bomar speculates the term "southern rock" may have been coined in 1972 by Mo Slotin, writing for Atlanta's underground paper, The Great Speckled Bird, in a review of an Allman Brothers Band concert.

History

1950s and 1960s: origins 
Rock music's origins lie mostly in the music of the American South, and many stars from the first wave of 1950s rock and roll such as Bo Diddley, Elvis Presley, Little Richard, Buddy Holly, Fats Domino, and Jerry Lee Lewis hailed from the Deep South. However, the British Invasion and the rise of folk rock and psychedelic rock in the middle 1960s shifted the focus of new rock music away from the rural south and to large cities like Liverpool, London, Los Angeles, New York City, and San Francisco. In the 1960s, rock musician Lonnie Mack blended black and white roots-music genres within the framework of rock, beginning with the hit song "Memphis" in 1963. Music historian Dick Shurman considers Mack's recordings from that era "a prototype of what later could be called Southern rock". From late 1960s to early 1970s, popular musicians in south area were Janis Joplin, Creedence Clearwater Revival (from California), Leon Russell, Delaney & Bonnie, Dale Hawkins, and Tony Joe White.

1970s: peak of popularity 
The Allman Brothers Band, based in Macon, Georgia, made their national debut in 1969 and soon gained a loyal following. Their blues rock sound on one hand incorporated long jams informed by jazz, and on the other hand drew from native elements of country and folk. They were also contemporary in their electric guitar and keyboard delivery. Gregg Allman commented that "Southern rock" was a redundant term, like "rock rock." Late 1970s southern rock bands such as The Atlanta Rhythm Section (former Classics IV) and the Amazing Rhythm Aces were gained hit with bluesy vocal. While Allman Brothers Band's offshoot Sea Level explored crossover and jazz fusion. Wet Willie, Molly Hatchet, Blackfoot, ZZ Top, Johnny Winter,  Edgar Winter Group, Grinderswitch, and Black Oak Arkansas were also popular southern rock musicians in 1970s. Loosely associated with the country music style of Southern rock were acts like Barefoot Jerry from North Carolina. The Outlaws from Tampa, Florida, brought bluegrass licks into their music.

Stephen Thomas Erlewine said that Charlie Daniels' self-titled debut album, released in 1970, was a pivotal recording in the development of the Southern rock genre, "because it points the way to how the genre could and would sound, and how country music could retain its hillbilly spirit and rock like a mother." Erlewine described Daniels as "a redneck rebel, not fitting into either the country or the rock & roll [...] but, in retrospect, he sounds like a visionary, pointing the way to the future when southern rockers saw no dividing lines between rock, country, and blues, and only saw it all as sons of the south." Daniels later formed the Charlie Daniels Band, a group which fused rock, country, blues, and jazz; Erlewine described the band's sound as "a distinctly Southern blend" which emphasized improvisation in their instrumentation. After the success of "The Devil Went Down to Georgia", a single which Erlewine described as a "a roaring country-disco fusion", Daniels shifted his sound from rock to country music. In both Daniels' rock and country recordings, Daniels "helped shape the sound of country-rock".  

In the early 1970s other Southern rock groups emerged, influenced by the British rock and hard rock guitar sound: notably, the sound of Richie Blackmore, Jeff Beck, Eric Clapton, Jimmy Page,and Paul Kossoff. The harder rocking Southern groups' music emphasized boogie rhythms and fast guitar leads with lyrics extolling love affair, dream, desire, hard work, of Southern working-class young adults, like the outlaw country movement. Lynyrd Skynyrd of Jacksonville, Florida recorded "Free Bird", "Sweet Home Alabama", "Saturday Night Special" and "What's Your Name". They played  British hard rock influenced music until the deaths of lead singer Ronnie Van Zant and two other members of the group in a 1977 airplane crash. After this tragic plane crash, members Allen Collins and Gary Rossington started the Rossington Collins Band.

The Marshall Tucker Band, from Spartanburg, South Carolina opened many of The Allman Brothers Band concerts and were creatively on par with The Allman Brothers Band, using elements of blues, country rock and blues rock in their music. They gained hit "Heard it in a Love Song" in 1977.

Duane Allman's playing on the two Hour Glass albums and an Hour Glass session in early 1968 at FAME Studios in Muscle Shoals, Alabama had caught the ear of Rick Hall, owner of FAME. In November 1968, Hall hired Allman to play on an album with Wilson Pickett. Allman's work on that album, Hey Jude (1968), got him hired as a full-time session musician at Muscle Shoals and brought him to the attention of a number of other musicians, such as Eric Clapton, who later related how he heard Pickett's version of "Hey Jude" on his car radio and called Atlantic Records to find out who the guitarist was: "To this day," Clapton said, "I’ve never heard better rock guitar playing on an R&B record. It's the best." Duane Allman was killed by motorcycle accident in 1971.  Louisiana's Le Roux ranged from Cajun-flavored sound early years, on to a more AC, hard rock, arena rock sound later on.

1980s and 1990s: continuing influence 
By the beginning of the 1980s, the Allman Brothers Band and Lynyrd Skynyrd had disbanded, and Capricorn Records had gone bankrupt. Leading acts of the genre (in particular, 38 Special) had become enmeshed in corporate arena rock. With the rise of MTV, new wave, funk, urban contemporary, and heavy metal, most surviving Southern rock groups were relegated to secondary or regional venues. Rock musicians such as Molly Hatchet, Outlaws, Georgia Satellites, the Fabulous Thunderbirds, Jimmy Vaughan, Point Blank, Tom Petty, Bruce Hornsby, Steve Earle, Widespread Panic, and Kentucky Headhunters, emerged as popular Southern bands across the southeastern United States during the 1980s and 1990s.

During the 1990s, the Allman Brothers reunited and became a strong touring and recording presence again, and the jam band scene revived interest in extended improvised music. 

Georgia's alternative rock band R.E.M. released the album Fables of the Reconstruction which explicitly invokes the Reconstruction Era in the title and is considered a Southern Gothic album.

The 1990s also saw the Black Crowes rise to mainstream popularity with the releases of Shake Your Money Maker (3× platinum), the Southern Harmony and Musical Companion (debut at #1 on the Billboard 200 and certified 2× platinum), and Amorica (certified Gold).

Metal/Punk 
From 1990s to 2000s, heavy metal and punk were popular in south area. Hard rock groups with Southern rock touches such as Jackyl renewed some interest in Southern rock. Several bands from the Southern United States (particularly New Orleans with its metal scene), such as Eyehategod, Acid Bath, Soilent Green, Corrosion of Conformity and Down, influenced by the Melvins, mixed Black Sabbath-style metal, hardcore punk and Southern rock to give shape to what would be known as sludge metal. Most notable sludge metal bands hail from the Southeastern United States. Most bands who have tried this style have slipped out of mainstream popularity, but there are still a few who belong to the genre, such as Maylene and the Sons of Disaster, and occasionally Hellyeah. Post-grunge bands such as Shinedown, Saving Abel, Saliva, 3 Doors Down, 12 Stones, and Black Stone Cherry have included a Southern rock feel to their songs and have recorded cover versions of Southern rock classics like "Simple Man" and "Tuesday's Gone". Blues rock/stoner rock band have a southern rock influence.

Southern rock influence can also be seen in the metal and hardcore punk genres. This is showcased by such bands as Maylene and the Sons of Disaster, He Is Legend, Nashville Pussy, the Showdown, Alabama Thunderpussy, Memphis May Fire, Acid Bath, and Down.

2000 to present 
New musicians such as the Tedeschi Trucks Band (the Derek Trucks Band), Warren Haynes, Gov't Mule, Chris Duarte Group, Dixie Witch, The Marcus King Band, Whiskey Myers, Widespread Panic, the Black Crowes, Blackberry Smoke, Kid Rock, JJ Grey & Mofro, and the Allman Betts Band are continuing the Southern rock art form. 

In 2005, singer Bo Bice took an explicitly Southern rock sensibility and appearance to a runner-up finish on the normally pop-oriented American Idol television program, with a performance of the Allmans' "Whipping Post" and later performing Skynyrd's "Free Bird" and, with Skynyrd on stage with him, "Sweet Home Alabama".

Southern rock currently plays on the radio in the United States, but mostly on oldies stations and classic rock stations. Although this class of music gets minor radio play, there is still a following for older bands like Lynyrd Skynyrd and the Allman Brothers play in venues with sizable crowds.

Additionally, alternative rock groups such as Drive-By Truckers, the Bottle Rockets(Missouri), My Morning Jacket(Kentucky), and Kings of Leon combine Southern rock with rawer genres, such as garage rock, alt-country, and blues rock. Much of the old style Southern rock (as well as other classic rock) has made its transition into the country music genre, establishing itself along the lines of outlaw country in recent years. 

Several of the original early 1970s hard rock Southern rock groups are still performing in 2020. This list includes Atlanta Rhythm Section (ARS), the Marshall Tucker Band, Molly Hatchet, Outlaws, Lynyrd Skynyrd, ZZ Top, Black Oak Arkansas, .38 Special and Dickey Betts. 

A number of books in the 2000s have chronicled Southern rock's history, including Randy Poe's Skydog – The Duane Allman Story and Rolling Stone writer Mark Kemp's Dixie Lullaby: A Story of Music, Race & New Beginnings in a New South. Turn It Up was released by Ron Eckerman, Lynyrd Skynyrd's former manager and plane crash survivor. Sociologist Jason T. Eastman analyzes contemporary southern rock to illustrate changes in today's southern identity in his book The Southern Rock Revival: The Old South in a New World.

South rock musicians like Little Big Town, Billy Currington and Ryan Adams combine the Southern rock sound with country, bluegrass and blues. This has been propelled by record labels like Capitol Records Nashville, Mercury Nashville and Lost Highway Records.

See also 
Country rock
Heartland rock
Roots rock
Swamp rock
Tulsa sound
List of southern rock bands
Southern Rock Gold

References

Sources 
 The Rolling Stone Illustrated History of Rock & Roll, Random House, 1980. "Southern Rock" entry by Joe Nick Patoski; 
 Kemp, Mark. Dixie Lullaby: A Story of Music, Race and New Beginnings in a New South, New York, New York: Free Press/Simon & Schuster, 2004, p. 17;

External links 
Road to Jacksonville – Southern Rock webzine with articles and interviews.
Pure Southern Rock website; accessed August 6, 2014.

 
American rock music genres
Blues music genres
Country music genres
Rock
Fusion music genres